Gary Kelly (born 10 May 1989) is an Australian based Northern Irish international indoor and lawn bowler.

Bowls career

Outdoors
He won a bronze medal in the Men's singles at the 2010 Commonwealth Games. In 2011 he won the pairs silver medal at the Atlantic Bowls Championships and in 2015 he won the pairs gold medal at the Atlantic Bowls Championships.

He won a silver medal for a combined Irish team with bowls pairs partner Ian McClure in the pairs at the 2016 World Outdoor Bowls Championship.

In 2018 he was selected as part of the Northern Ireland team for the 2018 Commonwealth Games on the Gold Coast in Queensland and in 2020 he was selected for the 2020 World Outdoor Bowls Championship in Australia.

In addition to his international successes he also won the 2007 Irish National Bowls Championships singles.

Kelly moved to Australia after the 2018 Commonwealth Games and won the delayed 2020 Australian triples title with Corey Wedlock and Brendan Aquilina at the Australian National Bowls Championships. In 2022, he competed in the men's singles and the men's triples at the 2022 Commonwealth Games.

Indoors
His first major success indoors came in 2019 after he defeated Brendan Aquilina in the final of the World Cup Singles.

He was part of the winning trio that won the inaugural Ultimate Bowls Championship in April 2019 winning $60,000 AUD in prize money.

References

External links
  (2010)
 
 

1989 births
Living people
Male lawn bowls players from Northern Ireland
Commonwealth Games medallists in lawn bowls
Commonwealth Games bronze medallists for Northern Ireland
Bowls players at the 2010 Commonwealth Games
Bowls players at the 2018 Commonwealth Games
Bowls players at the 2022 Commonwealth Games
Medallists at the 2010 Commonwealth Games
Medallists at the 2022 Commonwealth Games